Sunday Nzante Spee (Mbem, 1953 – Stockton, California, USA May 25, 2005) was a Cameroonian artist.

When he was a teenager, he used to make some paintings and decorations in façades. From 1976 to 1982, he attended the Fine Arts School of Nigeria and Ivory Coast.

In spite of the difficulties to have an artistic career in Cameroon, he decided to establish an atelier and a training centre in Bamenda, the Spee Art Center, where he could make a living of his works, and he influenced next generations.

His style, from cubism to surrealism and addressed to a naïve caricature but full with provocative humour, culminates in a pictorial world where all these expressions are mixed in the so-called melting age aesthetic.

External links
 Site du Spee Art Center
 Page de la galerie Peter Herrmann
 Google pictures

1953 births
2005 deaths
Cameroonian painters
People from Bamenda
20th-century Cameroonian painters